V. K. Ramaswamy (alternatively Ramasamy or Ramaswami) may refer to:
 V. K. Ramaswamy (umpire) (born 1945), former Indian Test cricket umpire
 V. K. Ramasamy (actor) (1926–2002), Indian actor, comedian and film producer
 V. K. Ramaswami Mudaliar, Indian politician
 V. K. Ramaswamy, Chief Economic Advisor, Government of India